Angophora woodsiana, commonly known as smudgee, is a species of small to medium-sized tree that is endemic to eastern Australia. It has rough bark on the trunk and branches, lance-shaped or curved adult leaves, flower buds in groups of three or seven, white or creamy white flowers and ribbed, cup-shaped fruit.

Description
It has rough, fibrous grey or brownish bark on the trunk and branches.

Taxonomy and naming
Angophora woodsiana was first formally described in 1881 by Frederick Manson Bailey in the journal Proceedings of the Linnean Society of New South Wales. The specific epithet (woodsiana) honours "the Rev. J. E. Tenison-Woods, F.G.S., President of the Linnean Society, New South Wales". Genetic analysis shows it to be closely related to broad-leaved sandstone apple (Angophora robur).

Distribution and habitat
Smudgee grows in sandy soil on sandstone hills in forest from Tin Can Bay in Queensland to Coffs Harbour in New South Wales and sporadically on the Darling Downs.

Conservation status
This eucalypt is classified as of "least concern" in Queensland under the Queensland Government Nature Conservation Act 1992.

References

woodsiana
Flora of New South Wales
Trees of Australia
Flora of Queensland
Plants described in 1881